Jim is a given name or a hypocorism of the given name James and a short form of Jimmy.

People
 Jim Acosta (born 1971), American journalist
 Jameel "Jim" Al-Khalili (born 1962), British physicist and author
 Jim Bakker (born 1940), American televangelist
 Jim Banks (born 1979), U.S. representative from Indiana
 Jim Belushi (born 1954), American actor
 Jim Boeheim (born 1944), American basketball coach
 Jim Breuer (born 1967), American comedian
 Jim Bridwell (1944–2018), American rock climber
  Jim Broadbent (born 1949), English actor
 Jim Brown (born 1936), American professional football player
 Jim Brown, multiple people
 Jim Ed Brown (1934-2015), American singer-songwriter
 Jim J. Bullock (born 1955), American actor
 Jim Caldwell (born 1955), American football coach
 Jim Cantore (born 1964), American meteorologist and on-air TV personality
 Jim Carrey (born 1962), Canadian-American actor
 Jim Carroll (1949-2009), American poet and author
 Jim Caviezel (born 1968), American actor 
 Jim Clark (1936–1968), British racing 
 Jim Clyburn (born 1940), American politician
 Jim Conroy (born 1970), American voice actor
 Jim Courier (born 1970), American tennis player
 Jim Cramer (born 1955), American TV personality
 Jim Crawford (multiple people) 
 Jim Croce (1943–1973), American folk and rock singer-songwriter
 Jim Cummings (born 1952), American voice actor
 Jim Davidson (born 1953), British stand-up comedian
 Jim Davis (born 1945), American cartoonist
 Jim Devine (born 1953), British politician
 Jim Downey (born 1952), American humorist
 Jim Doyle, multiple people
 Jim Bob Duggar (born 1965), American television personality
 Jim Farley (born 1962), CEO of Ford Motor Company
 Jim Florentine (born 1964), American comedian
 Jim Fitzgerald (1926-2012), American businessman and professional sports owner
 Jim Fitzpatrick (disambiguation), multiple people
 Jim Furyk (born 1970), American golfer
 Jim Gaffigan (born 1966), American comedian
 Jim Gordon (born 1945), American musician
 Jim Grabb (born 1964), American tennis player ranked World No. 1 in doubles
 Jim Inhofe (born 1934), US Senator
 Jim Hanks (born 1961), American actor
 Jim Harbaugh (born 1963), American football coach
 Jim Haslam (born 1930), American businessman
 Jim Henson (1936-1990), American film director and puppeteer
 Jim Hopper, multiple people
 Jim Jefferies (born 1977), Australian stand-up comedian
 Jim Jinkins (born 1953), American animator
 Jim Johnson (disambiguation), multiple people
 Jim Jones (1931–1978), American religious cult leader
 Jim Jordan (disambiguation), multiple people
 Jim Justice (born 1951), American politician
 Jim Kelly, multiple people
 Jim Lang (born 1950), American composer
 Jim Letherer (1933–2001), American civil-rights activist
 Jim Lovell (born 1928), American astronaut
 Jim Mattis (born 1950), retired United States Marine Corps general
 Jim McGovern (born 1959), American politician
 Jim Morrison (1943–1971), American poet and singer of The Doors 
 Jim Nabors (1930–2017), American actor
 Jim Nantz (born 1959), American sportcaster
 Jim Norton (disambiguation)
 Jim Parrack (born 1981), American actor
 Jim Parsons (born 1973), American actor
 Jim Ramey (born 1957), American gridiron football player
 Jim Reeves (1923-1964), American singer and songwriter
 Jim Rogers (born 1942), American businessman and writer 
 Jim Rohn (1930–2009), American entrepreneur
 Jim Schwartz (born 1966), American football coach
 Jim Sturgess (born 1978), English actor
 Jim Guy Tucker (born 1943), American politician
 Jim Varney (1949-2000), American actor
 Jim Wise (born 1964), American actor

Fictional characters
Jim, one of The Blues in Angry Birds
Jim, one of two major characters in the classic novel Adventures of Huckleberry Finn
Jim Block, a character in the U.S. film Final Destination 5
Jim Wilson, a character in Marvel comics
Jim Halpert, a character in the U.S. version of the television sitcom The Office
Jim Hawkins, the protagonist in Robert Louis Stevenson's novel Treasure Island
Jim Hopper, a character in the television series Stranger Things
Jim Robinson, a character from the Australian soap opera Neighbours
 Jim Lahey, a trailer park supervisor on Trailer Park Boys
Jim Lake Jr., the protagonist in Trollhunters: Tales of Arcadia
Jim Raynor, a character in StarCraft II: Wings of Liberty
Jim Rockford, a character on the television series The Rockford Files
Jim Morita, a character appearing in American comic books published by Marvel Comics
Jim Ignatowski, a character in the 1970s television series Taxi
Jim Clancy, a character from Ghost Whisperer
Jim Walsh, a character in Beverly Hills, 90210
James Donovan Halliday, a character in the novel Ready Player One
Earthworm Jim, the titular character in the Earthworm Jim franchise

See also
Jim (disambiguation)

English-language masculine given names
English masculine given names
Masculine given names
Hypocorisms